"Monkey Wrench" is the lead single by American rock band Foo Fighters from their second album, The Colour and the Shape. The lyrics chronicle the 1997 disintegration of singer/songwriter Dave Grohl's four-year marriage to Jennifer Youngblood. The song peaked at number 9 on the Billboard Mainstream Rock Tracks chart, and at number 12 on the UK Singles Chart.

Composition
"Monkey Wrench" is an up-tempo rock song, written in the key of B major in 4/4 time signature with a tempo of 174 bpm. It is performed with distorted guitars in Drop-D tuning. The song opens with a four bar phrase of a descending guitar line over a chordal riff of B5/F#5/E5 repeated twice. After a single bar of 3/4 time, the main verse enters with vocals and a choppier, palm-muted version of the intro riff. A pre-chorus using an E5 power chord then gives way to a chord-based chorus of B5/G#5/F#5/E5/F#5/E5/C5/B5.

Lyrically, Grohl has said that the song is "about realising that you are the source of all of the problems in a relationship and you love the other person so much, you want to free them of the problem, which is actually yourself."

Critical reception
"Monkey Wrench" is widely regarded as one of the Foo Fighters' best songs. In 2020, Kerrang ranked the song number three on their list of the 20 greatest Foo Fighters songs, and in 2021, American Songwriter ranked the song number seven on their list of the 10 greatest Foo Fighters songs.

Music video
The music video was directed by the band's lead singer/songwriter, Dave Grohl. In the video, Grohl arrives at his apartment with groceries in hand, but finds the door secured from inside by the chain latch when he tries to open it. Looking through the peephole, he finds black-clad duplicates of the band members playing the song. The rest of the band soon joins him at the door, peeking in through its mail slot, and eventually start trying to force their way in as the duplicate Grohl taunts them and spits on the peephole. He holds the door shut against the band's efforts for a while, but they eventually break in only to find the apartment suddenly empty. They look out the window and see the duplicates fleeing on foot through a courtyard, then close the door and finish the song using the abandoned instruments. As the video ends, a third set of bandmates is listening at the door outside, creating a recursive situation.

When Grohl is in the elevator heading up to his apartment, a muzak version of the Foo Fighters song "Big Me," performed by The Moog Cookbook, can be heard.

The music video for the song was the first to feature Taylor Hawkins on drums, although the actual drum track is performed by Grohl.

Personnel on record
 Dave Grohl – vocals, guitar, drums
 Pat Smear – guitar
 Nate Mendel – bass

Track listings and formats
 US 7" Vinyl / NT CD Single
 "Monkey Wrench"  – 3:54
 "The Colour and the Shape"  – 3:26
 AUS / EU / JP / UK CD Single
 "Monkey Wrench"  – 3:54
 "Up in Arms" (Slow Version) – 3:11
 "The Colour and the Shape"  – 3:22
 UK CD 2
 "Monkey Wrench"  – 3:54
 "Down in the Park"  – 4:07
 "See You" (Acoustic) – 2:27

Charts and certifications

Charts

Certifications

Accolades

References

1997 singles
Foo Fighters songs
Songs written by Dave Grohl
Songs written by Pat Smear
Song recordings produced by Gil Norton
RCA Records singles
1997 songs
Songs written by Nate Mendel
American pop punk songs
American punk rock songs